The National Front of Iran is an opposition political organization in Iran, founded by Mohammad Mosaddegh in 1949. It is the oldest and arguably the largest pro-democracy group operating inside Iran despite having never been able to recover the prominence it had in the early 1950s.

Initially, the front was an umbrella organization for a broad spectrum of forces with nationalist, liberal-democratic, socialist, bazaari, secular and Islamic tendencies, that mobilized to successfully campaign for the nationalization of the Iranian oil industry. In 1951, the Front formed a government which was deposed by the 1953 Iranian coup d'état and subsequently repressed. Members attempted to revive the Front in 1960, 1965 and 1977.

Before 1953 and throughout the 1960s, the Front was torn by strife between secular and religious elements; over time its coalition split into various squabbling factions, with the Front gradually emerging as the leading organization of secular liberals with nationalist members adhering to liberal democracy and social democracy.

During the Iranian Revolution, the Front supported the replacement of the old monarchy by an Islamic Republic and was the main symbol of the "nationalist" tendency in the early years of post-revolutionary government. It was banned in July 1981, and although it remains under constant surveillance and officially it is still illegal, it is still active inside Iran.

Mossadegh era (1949–1953)

The National Front had its roots in a protest against ballot-rigging, where Mohammad Mosaddegh led a peaceful procession from his house to the Marble Palace on 15 October 1949, threatened to take sanctuary in a major mosque or shrine, and was eventually allowed into the palace with 19 other people, where they stayed for four days. The Shah, Mohammad Reza Pahlavi, eventually gave in and promised fair and honest elections. After the sit-in, the leaders of the protest formed the National Front and elected Mossadegh to be its chairman. The Front was conceived to be a broad alliance of like-minded associations (rather than individuals, as in a normal political party) with the aim of strengthening democracy, press freedom, and constitutional government. The most important groups in the Front were the Iran Party, the Toilers Party, the National Party, and the Tehran Association of Bazaar Trade and Craft Guilds.

Soon after its founding, the National Front opposed the existing Western domination and control of Iran's natural resources, and related revenues, which began with colonialist concessions given during the Qajar dynasty. By the mid-1950s, Iran's oil assets were owned by the Anglo-Iranian Oil Company, whose predecessor company bought the concession from William Knox D'Arcy. D'Arcy had negotiated the concession in 1901 with Mozzafar al-Din Shah Qajar, the Shah of Persia, who granted a 60-year petroleum search concession in a transaction in which no money changed hands. For most of the first half of the twentieth century, Iran's oil was the British government's single largest overseas investment; 51 percent of the company was owned by the British government. The AIOC, which later became BP, consistently violated the terms of the agreement that had been updated in 1933, and was reluctant to change the terms of the agreement even as Iran's movement for nationalization grew in the late 1940s. Although AIOC was highly profitable, "its Iranian workers were poorly paid and lived in squalid conditions."

The goal of the National Front was to nationalize Iran's oil resources and to counteract British dominance of Iran's internal affairs by initiating direct relations with the United States. The Front became the governing coalition when it took office in April 1951, with Mosaddegh elected Prime Minister. Mosaddegh's minister of foreign affairs Hosseyn Fâtemi enforced the "Oil Nationalization Act", passed by the Majlis in March and ratified by the Senate. The Act, reluctantly signed by the Shah, called for nationalization of the assets held by AIOC, from which the government of Iran had hitherto only received minimal compensation. This led to British counter-moves and the loss of nearly all income during the Abadan Crisis.

Following Britain's request, U.S. President Dwight D. Eisenhower authorized the Central Intelligence Agency (CIA) to overthrow the Mossadegh government, in an event known as the 1953 Iranian coup d'état. Prior to the coup, the National Front was made up of four main parties; the Iran Party, which was founded in 1946 as a platform for Iranian liberals, including figures such as Karim Sanjâbi, Gholam Hossein Sadighi, Ahmad Zirakzadeh and Allah-Yar Saleh; the Toilers Party of the Iranian Nation (a left-wing party that advocated a non-communist socialist Iran, led by Mozzafar Baghai and Khalil Maleki); and the Mojâhedine Eslâm (an Islamic party led by Âyatollâh Âbol-Ghâsem Kâšâni).

Second and Third National Front

In the aftermath of the 1953 coup, the National Front was outlawed and its highest-ranking leaders arrested and brought before a military court. The military coup established Mohammad Reza Shah as the supreme leader of Iran, although nominal power was held by Prime Minister Fazlollah Zahedi (who was paid by the CIA to help overthrow Mossadegh and strengthen the power of the monarchy). In an atmosphere of police repression, several former members of the National Front (mostly low-ranking leaders) established an underground network called the National Resistance Movement. This group included future prime ministers Mehdi Bazargan and Shapour Bakhtiar, and its aim was to reestablish democracy by campaigning for free and fair elections. Its activities were largely restricted to peacefully distributing flyers and attempting to regulate the 1954 Majlis elections (which in the end were rigged in favor of pro-Shah candidates). It disintegrated under pressure from the state; however, the Second National Front was formed in 1960, which consisted of prominent people such as Karim Sanjabi, Mehdi Bazargan, Allahyar Saleh, Shapour Bakhtiar, Adib Boroumand, Asqar Pârsâ, Dâryuš Foruhar, Qolâm Hosseyn Sadiqi, Mohamad Ali Khonji and others. Its aim was to return Mohammad Mossadegh to the premiership and to reestablish the constitutional monarchy. Initially, it seemed as if this organization was gaining in strength. However, the group's leaders fell into disagreements over questions such as the organization of the Front, tactics against the Shah's regime, and the form of government to which the National Front ought to commit itself. These disputes led to tension between the high-ranking leaders and the student activists; in 1961, Bazargan, Mahmoud Taleghani (a prominent Islamic cleric) and others formed the Freedom Movement of Iran (FMI) which was committed to a democratic state in which the Islamic religion would play a substantial role in state and society (as opposed to the more secular orientation of the National Front).

Another issue arose over the appointment in April 1961 of Dr. Ali Amini to the premiership. It was widely believed that the Shah had chosen Amini under pressure from the Kennedy Administration in the United States; partly for this reason, the National Front's leaders persistently refused to collaborate with or lend support to Amini's government. However, political turmoil grew worse; Amini stepped down from the premiership in 1962, owing to his dispute with the Shah over the former's plans to reduce the military budget. In June the following year, a huge religious uprising occurred in the cities of Tehran, Qom, Mashad, Shiraz and Varamin, which was put down with ruthless force by the Iranian army. The unrest had been sparked by the arrest of Ayatollah Ruhollah Khomeini, a vocal critic of the Shah and his program of land reforms and granting women the right to vote. Around this time, the Third National Front was formed, which consisted of the FMI (religious-nationalists; Melli-Mazhabis), the Iran Nation Party (the party of Dâryuš Foruhar; Hezb-e Mellat-e Iran), the Society of Iranian Socialists (led by Khalil Maleki, a prominent personality of the Mossadegh era who had been prohibited from joining the Second National Front due to his past history in the Tudeh Party) and the student activists.

The Second and Third National Fronts differed largely in their tactical approach to facing the Shah's regime. The former believed in patiently negotiating with the Shah and the higher officials in the hope of peacefully bringing about a democracy. In contrast to this passive approach, the Third National Front advocated a strategy of civil disobedience and protests in the hope of either forcing the regime to come to terms with the opposition or face collapse. By 1964, however, Mohammad Reza Shah had consolidated his control of both his regime and the country, and he quickly moved to further guarantee his position by increasing the powers of SAVAK (the state's intelligence agency), which was infamous for the torture and killings it inflicted on the opposition and even on ordinary Iranians who merely uttered any wrong words against the regime. In this new atmosphere of police terror, the National Front virtually ceased to exist (though exile branches continued to operate in the United States and Europe).

Iranian Revolution
The National Front was revived in late 1977 by Karim Sanjabi (former minister of education under Mossadegh and now the leader of the Front), Shapour Bakhtiar (former deputy minister of labor under Mossadegh and now the leader of the Iran Party) and Dâryuš Foruhar (head of the Iran Nation Party). The three signed an open letter which politely criticized the Shah and called on him to re-establish the constitutional monarchy, free political prisoners, respect freedom of speech, and hold free and fair elections. For some months (under pressure from the Carter Administration), many educated and liberal-minded Iranians were now able to voice their grievances against the regime of the Shah.

In January 1978, violence erupted in the holy city of Qom over the publication of an article in a pro-government newspaper which attacked Ayatollah Ruhollah Khomeini as a British agent and a reactionary. Despite the threatening existence of SAVAK and the harsh crackdown unleashed by the regime on the protesters, the unrest grew and spread to other cities such as Tabriz, which was rocked by riots and briefly seized by rebels. By late 1978, almost the whole country (not just the organized opposition) was inflamed with hatred towards the Shah and rioting, protests and street clashes with the police and army grew in intensity and bloodshed. By this time, Ayatollah Khomeini was now recognized as the undisputed spiritual leader of the uprising. Sanjabi, as representative of the Front, came to Paris, and emerged from his meeting with Khomeini "with a short declaration that spoke of both Islam and democracy as basic principles," and committed the National Front to the twin goals of abolishing the monarchy and establishing a democratic and Islamic government in its place.

This was a diversion from the National Front's long-held aim of reforming the monarchy, and it caused some friction in the high council (although most of the rank and file and leaders supported the new orientation). The friction blew into open division when Shapour Bakhtiar, one of the three top leaders, accepted the Shah's invitation to become the prime minister of Iran, but only on the condition that the Shah committed himself to reign and not rule. Bakhtiar's decision to collaborate with the Shah caused the National Front to denounce him as a traitor to their cause and to expel him from the organization. Only a few moderate and secular individuals among the leadership chose to ally with Bakhtiar and with the monarchy.

On 16 January, the Shah left the country, amid rejoicing among the populace, and on 11 February, the regime collapsed and Ayatollah Khomeini became the political leader of Iran. At first the National Front supported the new Provisional Revolutionary Government and the establishment of the Islamic Republic. But the joint statement with Sanjabi notwithstanding, Khomeini "explicitly refused to put the same word, democracy, into either the title of the Republic or its constitution." Within a short time, it became clear that Ayatollah Khomeini's model of an Islamic society was modeled not on democracy, but on theocratic rule of Islamic jurists (or velayat-e faqih), and traditional Islamic sharia law.

1981 suppression
Perhaps the revolution's climactic confrontation between Khomeini's theocrats and the National Front occurred in June 1981 after parliament approved the law of retribution (qisas, aka blood revenge or "an eye for an eye"). The National Front called upon the people of Tehran to participate in a demonstration for 15 June 1981.

The Front intended the meeting to serve as the focus for the middle classes, the bazaar, and the left wing. It distributed 4 million leaflets. For the first time it attacked Khomeini directly as responsible for repression and a reign of terror. ... Barely two hours before the scheduled rally, however, Khomeini addressed the nation over the radio. He treated the protest meeting as `an invitation to uprising, an invitation to insurrection.` ... He demanded the Iran Freedom Movement disassociate itself from the National Front within the hour if they wished to escape retribution. ... His attack on [President] Bani-Sadr was equally uncompromising.

Khomeini declared that 'The National Front is condemned as of today,' and that all opponents of the law of retribution were apostates and threatened the leaders of the Front with the death penalty if they did not repent.

In the meantime Hezbollahi

members of the Revolutionary Guard and committees, men and women from the wards of south Tehran organized by the IRP machine poured into Ferdowsi Square, the designated meeting place for the rally. The large numbers of middle-class protesters and supporters of the National Front who also showed up were cowed into virtual silence. There was no organized demonstration, no speeches, no march.

Leaders of the Liberation Movement and Banisadr had to make a public apology for supporting the Front's appeal on TV and the radio.

Election results

Parliamentary elections

Party leaders
Mohammad Mosaddegh (1949–1960)
Allah-Yar Saleh (1960–1964)
Karim Sanjabi (1967–1988)
Adib Boroumand (1993–2017)
Seyed Hossein Mousavian (since 2018)

See also

 Confederation of Iranian Students, a political group with opposing views
Affiliated organizations
 Iran Party
 Party of the Iranian People
 Toilers Party of the Iranian Nation (left in 1952; defunct)
 Society of Muslim Warriors (left in 1952; defunct)
 Nation Party of Iran (left in 1979)
 League of Iranian Socialists (left in 1979; defunct)
 Third Force (defunct)
 Movement of God-Worshipping Socialists (defunct)
Splinter organizations
 Freedom Movement of Iran (1961)
 National Democratic Front (1979; defunct)

References

External links
Official website

 
1949 establishments in Iran
Political parties established in 1949
Political party alliances in Iran
Political parties of the Iranian Revolution
Banned political parties in Iran
Iranian nationalism
Secularism in Iran
Liberal parties in Iran
Centrist parties in Iran
Social democratic parties
Mohammad Mosaddegh